Dynamo Carlos Fredericks (born 4 April 1992) is a Namibian footballer who plays as a centre-back for Black Africa and the Namibia national football team.

Club career
Born in Windhoek, Fredericks started his career at Ramblers in 2010, before signing for Civics Windhoek in 2011. After two years at Civics Windhoek, Fredericks signed for Black Africa in 2013.

International career
Fredericks made his debut for Namibia in 2016 in a 3–1 victory against Burundi. Fredericks was called up to the Namibia squad for the 2019 Africa Cup of Nations but failed to make an appearance as Namibia were knocked out in the group stage.

Career statistics

International

International goals
As of 9 May 2020. Namibia score listed first, score column indicates score after each Fredericks goal.

References

External links
 
 
 

Living people
1992 births
Footballers from Windhoek
Namibia international footballers
Association football central defenders
Ramblers F.C. players
F.C. Civics Windhoek players
Black Africa S.C. players
Namibia A' international footballers
2018 African Nations Championship players
2020 African Nations Championship players
Namibian men's footballers